Margriet Matthijsse (born 16 April 1977, in Rotterdam) is a sailor from the Netherlands, who represented her country for the first time at the 1996 Olympics in Atlanta. Matthijsse took the silver in Europe. In the 2000 Olympics in Sydney Matthijsse took her second silver medal again in Europe. Matthijsse final Olympic appearance was during the 2004 Olympics in Athens. As crew in the Women's 470 with helmsman Lisa Westerhof she took 9th place.

She received the ISAF World Sailor of the Year Award in 1999.

References

External links

  
  
  
  

Living people
1977 births
Sportspeople from Rotterdam
Dutch female sailors (sport)
Sailors at the 1996 Summer Olympics – Europe
Sailors at the 2000 Summer Olympics – Europe
Sailors at the 2004 Summer Olympics – 470
Olympic sailors of the Netherlands

Medalists at the 1996 Summer Olympics
Medalists at the 2000 Summer Olympics
Olympic medalists in sailing
Olympic silver medalists for the Netherlands
ISAF World Sailor of the Year (female)
Europe class world champions
World champions in sailing for the Netherlands
20th-century Dutch women
21st-century Dutch women